Solca may refer to the following places:

 Sólca, Subcarpathian Voivodeship, Poland
 Solca, Poland, Silesian Voivodeship
 Solca Mała, Poland
 Solca Wielka, Poland
 Solca, Czech Republic
 Scolca, France
 Solca, a town in Suceava County, Romania
 Solca, a village in Oniceni Commune, Neamţ County, Romania
 Poieni-Solca, a commune in Suceava County, Romania
 Solca (river), a tributary of the Suceava in Suceava County, Romania
 Sociedad de Lucha Contra el Cancer

See also 
 Solec
 Solčava